The individual show jumping at the 1928 Summer Olympics took place on 12 August 1928 at the Olympic Stadium in Amsterdam. Scores from the individual competition were summed to give results in the team competition. There were 46 competitors from 16 nations. Each nation could send a team of three riders; 15 nations did so, while Japan had a single rider. The event was won by František Ventura of Czechoslovakia, the nation's first medal in individual jumping. France earned its first medal in the event since 1912 with Pierre Bertran de Balanda's silver. Charles-Gustave Kuhn took bronze, putting Switzerland on the podium for the second consecutive Games.

Background

This was the fifth appearance of the event, which had first been held at the 1900 Summer Olympics and has been held at every Summer Olympics at which equestrian sports have been featured (that is, excluding 1896, 1904, and 1908). It is the oldest event on the current programme, the only one that was held in 1900.

Three of the top 10 riders from the 1924 competition returned: gold medalist Alphonse Gemuseus of Switzerland, silver medalist (and 1920 gold medalist) Tommaso Lequio di Assaba of Italy, and ninth-place finisher José Álvarez de Bohórquez of Spain.

Argentina, Hungary, Japan, and the Netherlands each made their debut in the event. Belgium and France both competed for the fifth time, the only nations to have competed at each appearance of the event to that point.

Competition format

"The obstacles with number 16 as a maximum, the minimum height being 1 m. 25, and the maximum height 1 m. 40 (4’ to 4’ 9”). The canter must be free and at a speed of 400 m. (43 yds.) a minute. The timekeeper shall not take into account greater speed, but on the other hand a lower speed shall be penalised by 0.25 of a point per second over the time allowed. Grazing, displacing or touching the obstacles shall not be taken into account." The course was 720 metres long.

Ties for medal position were broken with re-rides, while all other ties were broken by time.

Schedule

The first round was interrupted by rain and had to be continued on the second day.

Results

The course was relatively easy, with seven riders able to finish with no faults. Three of them repeated the feat in the first re-ride, guaranteeing those riders the medals and requiring a second re-ride to determine who would receive which medal. In the second re-ride, some obstacles were raised to 1.60 metres in height to increase the difficulty.

Source: Official results; De Wael

References

Equestrian at the 1928 Summer Olympics